Princess Charming is a 2007 Philippine television drama series broadcast by GMA Network. Directed by Argel Joseph, it stars Krystal Reyes in the title role. It premiered on January 29, 2007 on the network's Dramarama sa Hapon line up. The series concluded on April 27, 2007 with a total of 63 episodes. It was replaced by Sinasamba Kita in its timeslot.

The series is streaming online on YouTube.

Premise
When Amparo consults a fortune teller about her business ventures, the fortune teller warns her that her ugly granddaughter would be her downfall. Amparo steals her infant granddaughter away from her parents and gives her to a woman. She then adopts a pretty baby girl from another woman and presents the baby to her son and daughter-in-law as their own daughter. The pretty child grows up as "Princess" and the ugly child grows up as "Charming".

Cast and characters

Lead cast
 Krystal Reyes as Princess de Saavedra
 Eunice Lagusad as Charming Santos

Supporting cast
 Mark Herras as Inoy Santos
 Mylene Dizon as Sofia Santos
 Carmina Villaroel as Mabel de Saavedra
 Zoren Legaspi as Enrico de Saavedra
 Chanda Romero as Doña Amparo de Saavedra
 Jackie Rice as Bernadette de Saavedra
 Lotlot de Leon as Lizette
 Arci Muñoz as Pamela
 Jade Lopez as Aleli Santos
 Allan Paule as Ronald Santos
 Dexter Doria as Loreta
 Luz Fernandez as Melinda
 Mel Martinez as Sushmita
 Joy Folloso as Vanessa Santos
 Sweet Ramos as Libby Santos
 Tart Carlos as Doris
 Zamierre Benevice as Bambi
 Darius Razon as Teroy
 Gerard Pizarras as Dante
 Kier Legaspi as Ricardo de Saavedra

Accolades

References

External links
 
 

2007 Philippine television series debuts
2007 Philippine television series endings
Filipino-language television shows
GMA Network drama series
Television shows set in the Philippines